The Central Bank of Lesotho is the central bank of Lesotho, in southern Africa.  The bank is located in Maseru and its current governor is Dr. Emmanuel Letete (effective from June 2022).  The bank was established in 1978 as the Lesotho Monetary Authority.

Governors
Kobeli Molemohi, 1979 - 1982
Stefan Schönberg, November 1982 - November 1985
Erik Lennart Karlsson, November 1985 - June 1988
Anthony Mothae Maruping, July 1988 - May 1998
Stephen Mustapha Swaray, 1998 - 2001
Motlatsi Matekane, 2001 - 2006
Moeketsi Senaoana, 2007 - 2011
Retselisitsoe Matlanyane, January 2012 - Dec 2021
Lehlomela Mohapi (acting) , January 2022 - May 2022
Emmanuel Letete , June 2022 - Present

Source:

See also

 List of central banks of Africa
 Economy of Lesotho
 List of central banks

References

External links
Central Bank of Lesotho official site

Economy of Lesotho
Lesotho
1978 establishments in Lesotho
Banks established in 1978
Banks of Lesotho